FRP may refer to:

Organizations
 FairPoint Communications (NASDAQ), an American telecommunications company
 Free Russian Press (1853–1867), a Russian-language publisher in Great Britain
 Family resource program, Canadian community-based organizations
 FRP Advisory, business advisory firm based in the United Kingdom

Politics
 Progress Party (Denmark)
 Progress Party (Norway)
 Federal Republic of the Philippines

Science and technology
 Fibre-reinforced plastic 
 Fluorescence recovery protein, in cyanobacteria
 Free radical polymerization
 Functional reactive programming, in computing
 Factory reset protection, on some Android phones

Other uses
 Fantasy role-playing
 Franco-Provençal language, ISO 639-3 code